Ntsele KaMashiya was the King of AmaHlubi from 1735 until his death in 1760. He fathered Bhungane II who ascended to the Hlubi throne in 1760. Ntsele is widely known for leading the AmaHlubi in a battle against the then AmaNgwane tribe led by Tshani and came out victorious. His reign was at the pre-period of both Hlubi's prosperity led by Bhungane II (son) and the period of power-struggle and fragile state of the tribe which was at peak during Mthimkhulu II's reign (grandson). He's also hailed and widely referred to as "Nasele",especially by Hlubi residing in Eastern Cape.

References

1775 deaths
18th-century monarchs in Africa
Hlubi kings